Apeiron is a Macintosh game developed and released as shareware by Ambrosia Software. An adaptation of the 1980 arcade game Centipede, it was first released on February 11, 1995.  In November 2004, a Mac OS X port was made available.

Reception

Writing in the 1996 edition of The Macintosh Bible, Bart Farkas called Apeiron a "classic" and "the best Centipede clone on the market". MacAddict named it one of the Macintosh's essential titles. The magazine's Kathy Tafel cited it as "a cool implementation" of the Centipede formula.

References

External links
Apeiron homepage
Apeiron X homepage

1995 video games
Classic Mac OS games
MacOS games
Ambrosia Software games
Fixed shooters
Video game clones
Video games developed in the United States